Nafpaktiakos Asteras is a Greek football club based in the town of Nafpaktos, Greece.

History
It was formed by the conjunction of two former clubs of the city: Nafpaktiakos and Asteras Nafpaktou, in 1958. The club's (full name: "Papacharalambeios Athlitikos Syllogos Nafpaktiakos Asteras"), as well as the team's home stadium (Papacharalabeio Ethniko Stadio), are named in the honour of Dimitrios Papacharalambous, a benefactor of the city.

Playing matches in local leagues until 1981, the club was promoted to the National Amateur Division - one below Beta Ethniki at that time - where it remained for a period of 3 years, only to be relegated again into local leagues, where in its turn remained for 10 years.

In 1991, Nafpaktiakos Asteras gained promotion to Delta Ethniki. After 6 years, it gained promotion to Gamma Ethniki. Following 3 years in that division, the club reached Beta Ethniki, but only to remain there for a year. Then, in the 2002-03 season, it was relegated to Delta Ethniki. In the 2006-07 season it competed in Gamma Ethniki, but it was relegated finishing 16th. In the summer of 2011, Nafpaktiakos Asteras merged with Akadimia Nafpaktou and the new club competed in the local A1 league for 2011-12 season. In the 2016-17 season, it went out third in a group to rise to Greece's third category.

Most of its footballers not only originate from Naupactus, which offers them an extra motive to play, but also are of a young age, offering the club continuity and bright future.

External links
 Club News (In Greek)

Nafpaktos
Association football clubs established in 1958
Football clubs in Central Greece
1958 establishments in Greece
Gamma Ethniki clubs